Shalya is an urban locality (a work settlement) and the administrative center of Shalinsky District of Sverdlovsk Oblast, Russia. Population:

History
Work settlement status was granted to it in 1942.

Administrative and municipal status
Within the framework of administrative divisions, Shalya serves as the administrative center of Shalinsky District and is subordinated to it. As a municipal division, the work settlement of Shalya together with thirty-eight rural localities in Shalinsky District is incorporated as Shalinsky Urban Okrug.

References

Notes

Sources

Urban-type settlements in Sverdlovsk Oblast